Nathan B. Coats is an American lawyer and jurist who served as the 46th chief justice of the Colorado Supreme Court from 2018 to 2020. Coats had been appointed to the court in 2000, by Governor Bill Owens and served until his retirement in 2020. His views while serving on the court were considered conservative.

Early life

Nathan B. Coats received an undergraduate degree from the University of Colorado in 1971, and later received a juris doctor from the university in 1977. He was admitted to the Colorado Bar Association in 1977.

Career

Law

Coats worked at a private practice in Longmont, Colorado, from 1977 to 1978. He worked under Attorney General Duane Woodard as Deputy Attorney General from 1983 to 1986. From 1986 to 2000, he served as a chief appellate deputy district attorney in Denver, Colorado. During Coats's career he appeared before the Colorado Courts of Appeals and Colorado Supreme Court over 150 times.

A man murdered a fourteen-year-old girl and confessed to her murder to police in 1983, after waiving his right to remain silent. However, his confession was ruled invalid after his defense attorneys argued that he was mentally ill. Coats argued for Colorado at the Colorado Supreme Court and won which allowed the confession to be admitted as evidence.

Colorado Supreme Court

Governor Bill Owens selected Coats on April 24, 2000, to replace Gregory K. Scott on the Colorado Supreme Court, becoming Owens' twentieth judicial nomination, after Scott's resignation. He was retained in the 2002 and 2012 elections.

He was considered "a fairly consistent conservative vote on the court" by Richard Collins, a professor from the University of Colorado Boulder. In 2006, the court ruled five to two to invalidate the Defend Colorado Now proposition as it was not a single-subject initiative, but Coats dissented stating that court took too much latitude with the single-subject requirement. The court ruled four to three in 2019, that a police search started as a result of a dog trained to detect marijuana was unconstitutional as marijuana was legal in Colorado, but Coats dissented in the decision.

Coats became the 46th chief justice of the supreme court on June 30, 2018, following the retirement of Chief Justice Nancy E. Rice who had served as chief justice since 2013. Coats retired once his reached the age of seventy-two which was the mandatory retirement age for judges and Justice Brian Boatright was selected to succeed him as chief justice. At the time of his retirement he was the last person appointed to the court by a Republican. He left the court on January 1, 2020, and Governor Jared Polis, in his first appointment to the supreme court, appointed Maria Berkenkotter to succeed him.

Electoral history

References

External links
Nathan Coats
Colorado Judicial Branch - Bio
Justice Nathan B. Coats

|-

21st-century American judges
1949 births
Chief Justices of the Colorado Supreme Court
Justices of the Colorado Supreme Court
Living people
University of Colorado alumni